Illorsuit Island is an island in the Avannaata municipality in northwestern Greenland.

Geography 

Settlement 
The  former settlement of Illorsuit was the only settlement on the island, located on the northeastern coast of the island. The settlement was abandoned in 2018 following a severe tsunami in June 2017.

References 

Islands of Greenland
Uummannaq Fjord